Tonni may refer to:

 Tonni (name)
 Tonni, Sovicille, Siena, Italy

See also

Tonna (disambiguation)
Tonti (disambiguation)